The Craig Cabin was built as a trapper's cabin near Bondurant, Wyoming between 1898 and 1900. Located in the Gros Ventre Range, the log cabin was occupied by Jack Craig from about 1902, who prospected for gold in the area. Despite claims that Craig found gold, there was no evidence that he found any significant amount. Craig advertised his operation on the radio and sold shares in the mine, but was alleged to have planted what gold he had on the site. Geological surveys indicated that what gold could be found had come from higher country via stream drainage. Craig stayed at the cabin during the summer and returned home to Salt Lake City in the winter. Disputes over water made Craig unpopular among local ranchers. From 1940 the cabin was used by Arthur Bowlsby as a lodge for visiting hunters. From 1971 the cabin was used by a succession of outfitting businesses and continues in that use.

There are two rooms downstairs with a loft above. A contemporaneous one-story log tack shed is nearby.

The site includes the cabin and mining apparatus used by Craig. A sluice box and water diversion ditches were used in placer mining

The Craig Cabin was listed in the National Register of Historic Places on September 19, 2016.

References

External links
Craig Cabin at the National Park Service
Craig Cabin at the Wyoming State Historic Preservation Office

Houses on the National Register of Historic Places in Wyoming
Rustic architecture in Wyoming
Houses in Sublette County, Wyoming
National Register of Historic Places in Sublette County, Wyoming